John Sanford Cohen (February 26, 1870May 13, 1935) was a United States senator from Georgia.

Life and career
Cohen was born in Augusta, Georgia, the son of Ellen Gobert (Wright) and Philip Lawrence Cohen. His father was from a long-established Jewish family. Cohen was raised in his mother's Episcopalian faith. His maternal grandfather was politician and Confederate Civil War general Ambrose R. Wright.

Cohen was educated at private schools in Augusta, the Richmond Academy, and Shenandoah Valley Academy at Winchester, Virginia. He attended the United States Naval Academy in 1885 and 1886, and became a newspaper reporter for the New York World in 1886. He was secretary to Secretary of the Interior Hoke Smith from 1893 to 1896, and was a member of the press galleries of the United States Congress from 1893 to 1897. During the Spanish–American War, he served as a war correspondent for the Atlanta Journal, and subsequently enlisted and served in the Third Georgia Volunteer Infantry, attaining the rank of major. He was a member of the army of occupation in Cuba, and was president of the Atlanta Journal, which he edited from 1900 to 1935. He originated the plan for the national highway from New York City to Jacksonville, Florida, and was vice chairman of the Democratic National Committee from 1932 to 1935.

Cohen was appointed on April 25, 1932 to the United States Senate as a Democrat to fill the vacancy caused by the death of William J. Harris and served from April 25, 1932 to January 11, 1933, when a successor was duly elected and qualified. He was not a candidate in 1932 to fill the vacancy, and continued his former business activities until his death in Atlanta. He was buried at Westview Cemetery, in Atlanta.

In 1942 Cohen was inducted into the Georgia Newspaper Hall of Fame.

Further reading

The Encyclopedia of the Spanish-American and Philippine-American War: A Political, Social, and Military History, Vol. I. By Spencer C. Tucker. p. 127
Jews in American Politics By Louis Sandy Maisel, Ira N. Forman, Donald Altschiller, Charles Walker Bassett. pp. 51, 52

References

External links 
Henry Ford and Major John S. Cohen among a group of men at WSB from the Broadcasting Collections at Georgia State University
Atlanta National Bank Board of Directors, 1911 from the Atlanta History Center

American newspaper editors
19th-century American Episcopalians
20th-century American Episcopalians
Jewish American people in Georgia (U.S. state) politics
People of the Spanish–American War
1870 births
1935 deaths
Politicians from Augusta, Georgia
Georgia (U.S. state) Democrats
Democratic Party United States senators from Georgia (U.S. state)